Halo James were a British pop group active from 1988 to 1991. They are best known for their hit single, "Could Have Told You So", which reached number 6 in the UK Singles Chart in 1990.

Career

Formation
Halo James formed in London. Named after the main character from the comic strip The Ballad of Halo Jones, the band were fronted by session musician/vocalist Christian James (born 21 December 1962) and included Ray St. John (guitar, bass, songwriting; formerly of Latin soul band Pride) and Neil Palmer (keyboards; formerly of short-lived synth-rock act Atomage and dance duo Two People) among its members. Their sound incorporated elements of soft rock, soul and synth-pop. Originally established as a side-project to Ray St. John's songwriting career after a chance meeting between St. John and James in early 1988 while both were doing session work in the same studio, the band was formed in November that year when Palmer, who had been a school friend of James, became involved in the project after the two other members decided that they needed a keyboard player to complete some rough demos that they were working on, and James recommended Palmer to St. John.

Chart success
The band became best known for their UK Top 10 hit single "Could Have Told You So". Released at Christmas 1989 as their second single, "Could Have Told You So" peaked at No. 6 for two weeks in February 1990, spent nearly three months in the Top 75 and became a major success all over Europe; at the time of its release, the song garnered mainly positive reviews, and drew a fair deal of comment from reviewers due to similarities with The Walker Brothers' 1966 hit "The Sun Ain't Gonna Shine (Anymore)", with its mid-tempo, wistful tune, and themes of lost and unrequited love. Halo James also received critical acclaim for their Epic Records album, Witness, which peaked at No. 18 on the UK Albums Chart, and went on to sell over 100,000 copies in its first year of release. Subsequently, "Could Have Told You So" regularly appeared on compilation albums for both the 1980s and 1990s. Despite garnering some radio airplay and positive reviews, the single was less commercially successful in the US, where it failed to chart on release in May 1990.

The band also scored four other minor UK hit singles as well as some success on the Indie scene in Britain, but never hit the Top 40 again.

Disbandment and aftermath
Halo James disbanded in April 1991 due to disputes between James and St. John about the band's long-term musical direction. They had been working on a second album for several months prior to the break-up. This album was scrapped, and the group have never reformed since.

Following the demise of the band, James continued as a session vocalist for a couple of years, with his song "Mission of Love" – originally intended for Halo James' unreleased second album – becoming a UK Top 30 hit for Jason Donovan in 1992; however, in the late 1990s he eventually abandoned his singing career to become a freelance writer. St. John, who had previously co-written Sade's 1984 hit "Smooth Operator" prior to forming Halo James, still remains active as a songwriter, and has written hit songs for several other worldwide artists, including Snoop Dogg and Gabrielle.   Palmer worked with Melanie between 1996 and 2001, and with Haddaway between 2002 and 2003; in 2004 he started a popular music shop in London called Rockbottom, but this closed in 2011 after being damaged in the England riots that summer. As of 2012, Palmer is now based in Germany and is the pianist for singer Xavier Naidoo.

Discography

Singles

Albums
Witness – Epic 466761 – UK No. 18 – 1990

References

English pop music groups
Musical groups established in 1988
Musical groups disestablished in 1991